“The story of Monsieur Jourdan, a botanist and the dervish Mastalishah, a famous sorcerer” the second comedy in four acts by the Azerbaijani writer and playwright Mirza Fatali Akhundov, written in 1850 in the Azerbaijani language. It is noted that the comedy was directed against the medieval feudal ideology, against superstitions. Translated by the author into Russian, it was published in 1851 in the Kavkaz newspaper. The first production on the Russian stage, on the translation of the author, took place in the same year in St. Petersburg, in 1852 the play was staged in Tiflis, and in 1883 - in Nakhchivan.

Monsieur Jourdans prototype was the French natural scientist Claude Thomas Alexis Jordan (1814-1897), who has come for real to the Transcaucasia for the purpose of scientific studies in those years and researched, in particular, the flora of Karabakh, where the action takes place in the comedy. It is even assumed that M. F. Akhundov was personally acquainted with the French scientist and talked with him, which helped him to create the artistic image of the scientist. It is noted that in his work M. F. Akhundov provides true data about the scientific activities of Alexis Jourdan and the amendments he made to the classification of the plants.

Plot 
The action takes place in Karabakh in 1848. The French botanist, member of the Royal Academy, Jourdan comes here to study the local plant species. He is visiting the ruler of the Tekle-Muganly nomad camp, Hatamkhan-agi. His nephew, the young Shahbaz, is attracted by Jourdans stories about Paris and is going to go there together with Jourdan to study sciences. However his fiancée, Sharafnis, and the aunt, Shahrabanu-khanum, do not want this. To hinder the trip, they resort to the help of the famous dervish Mastali, who came from Iran. For a hundred ducats, which Mastali got from the naive and superstitious women, he begins to destroy the capital of France. Mastali casts terrible spells, summons spirits and devils and gives them the order to destroy Paris with one blow, just as he destroys its image. Dervish rushes to
the planks spread on the floor, depicting a sinful city, and with one strong blow shatters them to smithereens. Suddenly there was a strong knock at the door and Monsieur Jourdan, who entered in excitement, announced that Paris was destroyed and that he must immediately return to France. The women were frightened by the quick execution of Mastali's magical actions. Even the dervish himself, in fear of what he had done, hides behind a curtain so that no one would find him. And to the question of Hatamkhan who came running: "Who ruined Paris?" Jourdan replies: "Devils!... Satan!... Villains!" Women have no doubts that Paris was destroyed by the dervish Mastali. In fact, there was a revolution in Paris, and the king fled. Frightened by this, Jourdan must immediately leave Karabakh. He leaves, but Shahbaz remains. Women triumph.

Screen adaptation 
In 1976, at the Azerbaijanfilm studio, based on the comedy directed by Shamil Mahmudbeyov and Kamil Rustambeyov, the movie “The Darvish Detonates Paris” was shot. Monsieur Jourdan was played by the Honoured Artist of the RSFSR Sergei Yursky, the dervish was played by the Honoured Artist of the Azerbaijan SSR Mirza Babayev. The People's Artist of the USSR Adil Isgandarov (Hatamkhan-agha), People's Artist of the Azerbaijan SSR Leyla Badirbeyli (Shahrabanu-khanum), Hasanagha Turabov (Rashid-bey) and others also starred in the film.

See also 
 Hekayati Molla Ibrahim-Khalil Kimyagar

References

External links
 The story of Monsieur Jourdan, a botanist and the dervish Mastalishah, a famous sorcerer
 The Darvish Detonates Paris

Azerbaijani plays
1850 plays
Plays set in Azerbaijan
Azerbaijani-language plays
Azerbaijani speculative fiction works
Works by Mirza Fatali Akhundzade